Wonders of the World are lists compiled over the ages that catalogue remarkable natural and man-made constructions.

Wonders of the World or Wonder of the World may also refer to:

Lists

Global lists
 Seven Wonders of the Ancient World, the traditional ancient list
 New 7 Wonders of the World, a 2007 list of wonders
 New 7 Wonders of Nature, a 2011 list of natural wonders

National lists

 Seven Wonders of Canada
 Seven Wonders of Colombia
 Seven Wonders of Poland
 Seven Wonders of Portugal
 Seven Wonders of Portuguese Origin in the World
 Seven Wonders of Russia
 Seven Wonders of Ukraine
 Seven Wonders of Wales
 Seven Natural Wonders of the UK

Other lists
 Seven Wonders of Jena, seven historical attractions in the German city of Jena

Games
 7 Wonders (board game), a 2010 board game by Antoine Bauza
 7 Wonders of the Ancient World (video game)

Literature
 Seven Ancient Wonders, a thriller novel by Matthew Reilly
 Seven Wonders (series), a series of books from Peter Lerangis
 Wonder of the World (play), a play by David Lindsay-Abaire
 Wonders of the Invisible World, a book by Cotton Mather
 Wonders of the Invisible World (McKillip collection), a collection of fantasy stories by Patricia A. McKillip

Music
 The Seven Wonders of the World (album), an album by Rick Wakeman
 Wonders of the World (album), an album by the Long Beach Dub Allstars
 "Seven Wonders" (song), a Fleetwood Mac song
 "Seven Wonders", a song by Nickel Creek from their 2002 album This Side
”WOTW / POTP” (“Wonder of the World / Power of the People”), a song by Coldplay from the 2019 album Everyday Life

Film and television
 Seven Wonders of the World, a 1956 Cinerama film
 Seven Natural Wonders, a 2005 BBC television series
 Seven Wonders of the Industrial World, a 2003 BBC television documentary series
 "The Seven Wonders" (American Horror Story), series finale of American Horror Story: Coven

See also
 Eighth Wonder (disambiguation)
 Wonderworld (disambiguation)
 World of wonder (disambiguation)
 "The world wonders", a phrase at the heart of a misunderstood message between Fleet Admiral Chester Nimitz and Admiral William Halsey Jr., during World War II.